Karen Gevorkian (born 7 May 1941) is an Armenian Soviet-Russian film director and screenwriter. He directed the film Spotted Dog Running at the Edge of the Sea, which won the Golden St. George at the 17th Moscow International Film Festival.

Gevorkian was born in Moscow into a musical family. Karen started to study the bassoon at the age of fourteen with Latvian bassoon soloist Andris Arnicans. Just one year later, he entered into the Gnessin Musical College. After working for a short period of time at Armenfilm Studios as a cinematographer, he studied and finished courses in Advanced Directing in Moscow.

References

External links
 Karen Gevorkian's biography

1941 births
Living people
Armenian film directors
Russian film directors
Soviet film directors